Negombo Cricket Club is a cricket team in Sri Lanka. In March 2017, they made a legal challenge against Sri Lanka Cricket after they were removed from Tier B of the 2016–17 Premier League Tournament. This prevented the 2016–17 Premier Limited Overs Tournament from taking place and it was replaced with the 2016–17 Districts One Day Tournament.

They were one of the teams that took part in the 2017–18 SLC Twenty20 Tournament. They finished fourth in Group A, with two wins and three losses from their five matches. Following the conclusion of the Twenty20 tournament, they also took part in the 2017–18 Premier Limited Overs Tournament.
Negombo CC is one of the upcoming first class teams which has done extremely well over the years and gained a spot in the tier a segment and as a highlight achievement they qualified for the quarter finals of the T20 domestic tournament led by  well known Dilshan Munaweera.

Squad
The following players were part of the team's squad for the 2020/2021 SLC Twenty20 Tournament:

 Dilshan Munaweera (c)
 Madawa Warnapura
 Upul Indrasiri
 Ashen Silva
 Angelo Jayasinghe 
 Lakshitha Manasinghe
 Ayantha De Silve
 Roshen Fernando
 Sahan Appuhami
 Pasindu thirimadura 
 Rosco Thatil
 Hareen Weerasinghe
 Chathuranga Rajapaksha
 Seshan Udara

References

External links
 Negombo Cricket Club at ESPN Cricinfo

Sri Lankan first-class cricket teams